Lachyang is a village development committee in Nuwakot District in the Bagmati Zone of central Nepal. At the time of the 1991 Nepal census it had a population of 3633 people living in 720 individual households.

References

External links
UN map of the municipalities of Nuwakot District

Populated places in Nuwakot District